The 2006 WGC-American Express Championship was a golf tournament that was contested from 28 September – 1 October 2006 at The Grove Golf Course in Hertfordshire, England. It was the seventh WGC-American Express Championship tournament, and the third of three World Golf Championships events held in 2006.

World number 1 Tiger Woods won the tournament with a record aggregate score of 261, to capture his fifth WGC-American Express Championship and his twelfth World Golf Championships title.

Round summaries

First round

Second round

Third round

Final leaderboard

External links
Full results

WGC Championship
Golf tournaments in England
WGC-American Express Championship
WGC-American Express Championship
WGC-American Express Championship
WGC-American Express Championship